Juan Martín del Potro was the defending champion, but lost to Gilles Simon in the quarterfinals.
Jo-Wilfried Tsonga won the title, defeating Tomáš Berdych in the final, 3–6, 7–6(8–6), 6–4.

Seeds
The top four seeds receive a bye into the second round.

Draw

Finals

Top half

Bottom half

Qualifying

Seeds

Qualifiers

Draw

First qualifier

Second qualifier

Third qualifier

Fourth qualifier

References
 Main Draw
 Qualifying Draw

Open 13 - Singles
2013 Singles